"Amazing" is a song by British singer-songwriter Matt Cardle, released as the third single from his debut studio album, Letters, on 19 February 2012. The song was co-written by Tom Leonard, Martin Harrington, Ash Howes, Richard Stannard and Cardle himself. The single was backed with an all-new track, "All Is Said", as well as a live version of "Slowly", and a studio version of his cover of "The First Time Ever I Saw Your Face".

Critical reception
Robert Copsey of Digital Spy gave the song a positive review, stating: "Co-written by the man himself and produced by Richard Stannard – Ellie Goulding, Will Young – 'Amazing' will do little to deter his detractors who claim he is nothing more than mushy MOR guitar-pop, but it should easily please his larger-than-you'd-think fanbase. Yes, it's another Keane-esque guitar-strumming number, the lyrics are clichéd – "Look inside this fragile heart of mine" – and he belts out his trademark ad-libs at the end, but – whisper it – sometimes you just can't beat a bit of no-frills pop." .

Lawsuit

On 9 June 2016, it was reported that Ed Sheeran and Johnny McDaid, were being sued by "Amazing" songwriters Harrington and Leonard, for $20 million for copyright infringement with their song "Photograph". The lawsuit says: "Given the striking similarity between the chorus of Amazing and Photograph, (the) defendants knew when writing, publishing, recording, releasing, and distributing Photograph that they were infringing on a pre-existing musical composition." Cardle clarified on Twitter that it was not his lawsuit, adding that he thinks Ed Sheeran is "a genius and 100% deserves all his success". The lawsuit was privately settled in April 2017, with no admission of guilt and an undisclosed sum.

Music video
The music video for "Amazing" premiered on 13 January 2012, at a total length of four minutes and six-seconds. The video shows scenes of Cardle performing the song in a dark room, direct to camera. Certain shots are filmed in a  style, with the camera and boom operators being seen in shot. It also shows scenes of couples in the surrounding studio, either upset or re-uniting.

Track listing

Chart performance

References

Matt Cardle songs
2012 singles
Rock ballads
Songs written by Martin Harrington
Songs written by Richard Stannard (songwriter)
Song recordings produced by Richard Stannard (songwriter)
Songs written by Ash Howes
2011 songs
Syco Music singles
Songs written by Matt Cardle